The Three Periods is a Quebec sovereigntist strategy. Before the 1993 federal election in Canada, Parti Québécois (PQ) leader Jacques Parizeau evoked a strategy for attainment of Quebec independence called the Three Periods. The strategy is partly inspired by the three periods of play in ice hockey (the most popular sport in Quebec). It is seen as a typical Parizeau concept: dedicated and straightforward, especially compared to some sovereigntist attitudes like a few (not all) of René Lévesque's (specifically in the last years of his government) or to the étapisme or "step-by-step" strategy.

The Three Periods Strategy

First period
 The election of a great number of candidates from the recently founded Bloc Québécois in Ottawa for 1993 federal election.
 It was achieved: the Bloc sent 54 Member of Parliament (MPs) to the House of Commons of Canada and became the Official Opposition. Parizeau and the PQ publicly supported the Bloc campaign.

Second period
 The election of a Parti Québécois government in Quebec for the 1994 Quebec election.
 It was achieved: 77 PQ Members of the National Assembly (MNAa) were elected to the National Assembly of Quebec, won a majority government and received a plurality (although slimmer than expected) in popular vote.

Third period
 The calling and victory of a second referendum on sovereignty for Quebec.
 It failed: the referendum was indeed called in 1995 with 49.42% in favour. Controversy over the nature of the referendum led to the Clarity Act of 2000.

Resurgence
After the plummeting popularity of the newly elected federalist Quebec government in 2003-2004, the sponsorship scandal, the Bloc's renewed popularity for the 2004 federal elections and the rise in support for sovereignty (49% in April 2004), some evoked the return of a new three part plan. Pauline Marois even wrote an article for the Saison des idées in 2004 in favour of establishing a four period plan.

See also

 Sovereigntist events and strategies
 Politics of Quebec
 History of Quebec
 Timeline of Quebec history
 List of Quebec general elections
 History of the Quebec sovereigntist movement

External links
 Parti Québécois website
 Bloc Québécois website

Quebec sovereignty movement
Quebec political phrases
Election campaign terminology